Ro-30, originally named Submarine No. 69, was an Imperial Japanese Navy Kaichu-Type submarine of the Kaichu V (Toku Chu) subclass. She was in commission from 1924 to 1938, seeing service in the waters of Formosa and Japan, then served as a stationary training hulk during World War II.

Design and description
The submarines of the Kaichu V sub-class were designed for anti-shipping operations and carried more fuel and had greater range and a heavier gun armament than preceding Kaichu-type submarines. They displaced  surfaced and  submerged.

For surface running, the submarines were powered by two  Sulzer diesel engines, each driving one propeller shaft. When submerged each propeller was driven by a  electric motor. They could reach  on the surface and  underwater.
The submarines were armed with four internal bow  torpedo tubes and carried a total of eight torpedoes. They were also armed with a single  deck gun and one 6.5 mm machine gun.

Construction and commissioning

Ro-30 was laid down as Submarine No. 69 on 27 June 1921 by Kawasaki at Kobe, Japan. Launched on 18 January 1923, she was completed and commissioned on 29 April 1924.

Service history

Upon commissioning, Submarine No. 69 was attached to the Sasebo Naval District, to which she remained attached throughout her active career. On 1 June 1924, she was assigned to both Submarine Division 25 — in which she spent her active career — and the Mako Defense Division headquartered at Mako in the Pescadores Islands. She was renamed Ro-30 on 1 November 1924. On 1 December 1926, she was reassigned to the Sasebo Defense Division, headquartered at Sasebo, Japan. Her service in the Sasebo Defense Division ended on 15 November 1934, after which she served as a unit of Submarine Division 25 in the Sasebo Naval District.

Ro-30 was decommissioned and placed in the Fourth Reserve on 15 December 1938. The Japanese struck her from the Navy list on 1 April 1942, and that day she became a stationary training hulk at the submarine school at Ōtake, Japan. She was scrapped ca. August 1945.

Notes

References
, History of Pacific War Vol.17 I-Gō Submarines, Gakken (Japan), January 1998, 
Rekishi Gunzō, History of Pacific War Extra, "Perfect guide, The submarines of the Imperial Japanese Forces", Gakken (Japan), March 2005, 
The Maru Special, Japanese Naval Vessels No.43 Japanese Submarines III, Ushio Shobō (Japan), September 1980, Book code 68343-44
The Maru Special, Japanese Naval Vessels No.132 Japanese Submarines I "Revised edition", Ushio Shobō (Japan), February 1988, Book code 68344-36
The Maru Special, Japanese Naval Vessels No.133 Japanese Submarines II "Revised edition", Ushio Shobō (Japan), March 1988, Book code 68344-37
The Maru Special, Japanese Naval Vessels No.135 Japanese Submarines IV, Ushio Shobō (Japan), May 1988, Book code 68344-39

Ro-29-class submarines
Kaichū type submarines
Ships built by Kawasaki Heavy Industries
1923 ships